Vivencio "Vince" Bringas Dizon (born August 18, 1974) is a Filipino economist, consultant and political aide who previously served as President and CEO of the Bases Conversion and Development Authority. He also served as President Rodrigo Duterte's Adviser on Flagship Programs and Projects and as Deputy Chief Implementer of the National Action Plan Against COVID-19.

Early life and education 
Dizon was born on August 18, 1974, in Quezon City but spent most of his childhood in Porac, Pampanga.

He attended Don Bosco Technical College for high school. From 1991 to 1996, he studied at De La Salle University (DLSU) where he earned a Bachelor of Arts degree in Economics and a Bachelor of Science in Commerce degree in Management of Financial Institutions. While there, he was a representative and vice-president of the DLSU Student Government. He was a consistent member of the Dean's Honors List and was awarded an Outstanding Thesis in Finance.

From 1998 to 1999, while a recipient of the British Chevening Scholarship Award, Dizon went to the University of Reading for his masteral studies. He graduated in December 1999 with a Master of Science degree in Applied Developmental Studies.

Career 
After his undergraduate studies, from 1996 to 1998, Dizon worked as an economic staffer to then-Senate President Edgardo Angara. He also served as his chief-of-staff from 2002 to 2004.

From 1999 to 2002, he was an assistant professor of Economics at DLSU. In 2004, he worked for the presidential campaign of Fernando Poe Jr. as a close-in assistant. After the 2004 elections, Dizon moved to the Czech Republic where he worked at the University of Northern Virginia Prague Campus as a senior lecturer in Economics, Finance and Statistics.

From 2007 to 2011, Dizon was the Vice-President for Corporate Communications of Strategic Alliance Holdings Inc. - Technologies. He then entered politics again in 2011, during the term of President Benigno Aquino III, when he became an Undersecretary at the Office of the Political Adviser under the Office of the President. He served in that position until 2013, when he then became a consultant to then-Senate Majority Leader Alan Peter Cayetano. He worked for Cayetano until July 2016.

Bases Conversion and Development Authority 

Dizon was appointed president and CEO of the Bases Conversion and Development Authority in August 2016. As such, he also became the chairman of the Subic-Clark Alliance Development, vice-chairman of the Clark International Airport Corporation, BCDA representative to the Clark Development Corporation board and member of the boards of directors of Fort Bonifacio Development Corporation, Bonifacio Estates Services Corporation and Bonifacio Global City Estates Association.

Upon his assumption of the post, Dizon, together with BCDA Chairman Gregorio Garcia III, revamped BCDA's brand statement, “We Build Great Cities While We Strengthen the Armed Forces” to emphasize the agency's mandate of providing economic opportunities to its military stakeholders while transforming former military camps into centers of growth. During Dizon's term as BCDA chief, the agency posted its highest contribution to its major stakeholder, the Armed Forces of the Philippines (AFP). BCDA remitted ₱15.16 billion to the AFP in the first three years of the Duterte administration alone, accounting for 33 percent of the total contributions made since 1993. Under Dizon, BCDA has remitted a total of ₱16.367 billion to the National Treasury.

BCDA's total assets increased by 7 percent from Php182 billion in 2018 to Php195 billion in 2019.

Dizon prioritized the development of Clark which is aligned with President Duterte's plan to decongest the capital Metro Manila and develop other potential economic hubs in the regions. On November 27, 2018, BCDA inaugurated its corporate office in Clark Global City and transferred part of its operations there, as part of the move to decentralize state offices in Manila. In the same month, Dizon led BCDA's launch of “Clark: It Works, Like a Dream,” a major campaign which integrates four investment districts namely, the Clark Freeport Zone, Clark Global City, Clark International Airport and the New Clark City.
 
Dizon saw Clark as one of the most financially viable lands of BCDA and prioritized the expansion of Clark International Airport and the development of the Philippines’ first smart, green, sustainable and resilient metropolis, New Clark City. In October 2020, the government announced that the construction of the new Clark International Airport Passenger Terminal Building is already 100 percent completed, and will be operational by 2021.
 
His term also saw quick development of New Clark City Phase 1A which served as the main sports hub for the 2019 Southeast Asian Games. The BCDA also hosted other major sporting events in the new sports complex, such as the 1st Philippine National Open Swimming Championships, Philippine Athletics Track and Field Association (PATAFA) qualifiers, and the first New Clark City Triathlon.
 
President Duterte included Dizon as a member of the Cabinet cluster on infrastructure in July 2019, and in September the same year, he was named Presidential Adviser for Flagship Programs and Projects to oversee monitoring and implementation of the administration's flagship infrastructure programs, and making recommendations thereto.

In November 2019, on a Senate interpellation for the Philippine Sports Commission Budget for 2020, Dizon was prominently coaching Senator Bong Go how to answer questions raised by Senator Franklin Drilon on the future financial viability of facilities built in BDCA for the 2019 Southeast Asian Games.

In October 2020, the Citizens Crime Watch Association  filed before the Office of the Ombudsman a complaint  for graft and malversation against Dizon, Government Corporate Counsel Elpidio Vega, and Isaac David, the director of Malaysian firm MTD Capital Berhad – the BCDA's partner in building New Clark. over the P11-billion New Clark facilities utilized in the 2019 SEA Games.

In December 2020, Dizon was appointed by President Duterte as the OIC chairperson of Clark Development Corporation, a subsidiary of the BCDA that manages Clark Freeport Zone.

On October 15, 2021, Dizon filed his resignation as BCDA president.

National Action Plan Against COVID-19 

During the 2020 COVID-19 pandemic and even while serving as BCDA chief, Dizon was appointed National Action Plan Against COVID-19 Deputy Chief Implementer, contributing to the government's policies in response to COVID-19 and serving as the country's Testing Czar. 
 
As chief coordinator of the government's "Test, Trace and Treat" strategy, Dizon played an active role in improving the Philippines’ COVID-19 testing capacity. In September, Dizon reported that 3 million Filipinos have been tested, with daily testing capacity reaching 42,000. Dizon was also actively involved in the conversion of major facilities to mega quarantine centers for COVID patients. 
 
In Clark, Dizon initiated the setting up of Task Force Clark Safe Haven to assist overseas Filipino workers (OFWs), both those stranded by the lockdown and those returning to the country.
 
Through Dizon and the Clark Development Corporation (CDC), Clark was able to host the Philippine Basketball Association (PBA) bubble, the first sports event in the country amid the COVID-19 pandemic.

In November 2021, Dizon took his oath of office as the new Presidential Adviser for COVID response. According to acting presidential spokesperson Karlo Nograles, his office is focused on the vaccination efforts of government.

Personal life 
Dizon is married to Essie Romero-Dizon and they have one daughter.

Awards received 

Dizon  received one of the highest civilian honors  - the Order of Lakandula  with the rank of Bayani for his important contributions to the Build Build Build program and the country’s response to the Covid 19 pandemic.

Dizon was named one of the 2019 People Asia's People of the Year, for his part in the Philippine economic team and his active role in the implementation of the Duterte's Build Build Build infrastructure program. 
 
He is also an Asia CEO Awards 2019 Circle of Excellence Awardee and was featured by Pampanga-based newspaper Punto! as “2018 Man of the Year” for the projects he spearheaded in Clark.

References 

1974 births
Living people
Filipino civil servants
De La Salle University alumni
Alumni of the University of Reading
Filipino chief executives
Duterte administration personnel
Benigno Aquino III administration personnel
People from Quezon City
People from Pampanga